
Red Cedar may refer to:

Trees 
 Toona ciliata, a tree in the mahogany family native to Asia and Australia
 Toona sureni, a tree in the mahogany family native from South Asia to Papua New Guinea
 Juniperus virginiana, an eastern North American juniper
 Juniperus procera, an East African juniper
 Thuja plicata, a western North American tree in the cypress family

Places 
Canada 
 Red Cedar Lake (Ontario), a lake in the Temagami region
United States
 Red Cedar, Wisconsin, a town in Dunn County
 Red Cedar (community), Wisconsin, an unincorporated community in Dunn County
 Red Cedar Lake (Wisconsin) 
 Red Cedar River (Michigan), a tributary of the Grand River
 Red Cedar River (Wisconsin), a tributary of the Chippewa River
 Cedar River (Iowa River), also known as Red Cedar River, in Minnesota and Iowa

Other uses 
 The Red Cedar, an unrecognized humanitarian protection emblem proposed by Lebanon